Sister Mary Paul Mulquin (1842 – 10 February 1930) was a Roman Catholic nun and educationalist born in Adare, Limerick, Ireland. Born Katherine Mulquin to John Mulquin, a landowner, and his wife Catherine, née Sheehy, she changed her name in 1863 once she became a member of the Sisters of the Presentation of the Virgin Mary, a Roman Catholic religious order.

While on board, she kept a diary which recorded her daily life.

In Australia, she helped to found a Presentation Convent and College in St Kilda, Victoria. She died aged about 88 and is buried in St Kilda Cemetery, alongside the other nuns who travelled together.

References

1842 births
1930 deaths
19th-century Irish nuns
People from County Limerick
19th-century Australian Roman Catholic nuns
20th-century Australian Roman Catholic nuns
Presentation Sisters
Irish emigrants to colonial Australia